Richard Dennen (born c.1980) is a British journalist and editor of Tatler. He is best known for his contributions to the fashion industry. He previously contributed to publications including The Sunday Times, The London Evening Standard, and The Mail on Sunday.

Early life
Dennen is the great-grandson of Field Marshal Earl Haig of Bemersyde and the son of Lyle Dennen, an Archdeacon of the Anglican Communion. He attended Charterhouse before studying French Civilisation at the Paris-Sorbonne University for his gap year. He completed his education at the University of St Andrews and graduated with a degree in the History of Art.

Career
Dennen began his career at Tatler, first as a young assistant and then as features editor. He moved to The Sunday Times and then the Mail on Sunday before returning to Tatler as editor in February 2018. He introduced Nigerian artist Oluwole Omofemi to the international audience thorough commissioning him for the commemorative Platinum Jubilee cover of Queen Elizabeth II.

References

1980s births
Living people
Alumni of the University of St Andrews
British journalists